Lunan District is a district of the city of Tangshan, Hebei province, China.

Toponymy 
Lunan District derives its name from its location to the south of the Beijing–Shanhaiguan railway.

History 
Much of Tangshan's early industry was concentrated in the area, especially in present-day Xiaoshan Subdistrict. According to the Lunan District government, the area of the present-day district was the site of China's first mechanized mine, first standard gauge railway, first steam locomotive, and mainland China's first university professor.

Lunan District was established in 1952.

Geography 
The  and the Qinglong river both flow through the district.

Administrative divisions
Lunan District administers nine subdistricts, one town, and one township.

Subdistricts 

Towns 

Townships 
The district's sole township is Nüzhizhai Township.

References

External links

County-level divisions of Hebei
Tangshan